Menna is a hamlet in the parish of Ladock, Cornwall, England, United Kingdom.  It should not be confused with Mena in the parish of Lanivet.

References

Hamlets in Cornwall